Sir John Talbot Dillwyn-Llewelyn, 1st Baronet (26 May 1836 – 6 July 1927) was a British Conservative Member of Parliament who was notable for his links to Welsh sports.

Background and education
Llewelyn was the son of photographer and scientist John Dillwyn Llewelyn and Emma Thomasina Talbot, youngest daughter of Thomas Mansel Talbot and Lady Mary (née Fox Strangways) of Penrice, south Wales and a cousin of William Henry Fox Talbot. He was educated at Eton and later Christ Church, Oxford.

Political career
Llewelyn was High Sheriff of Glamorgan in 1878 and Mayor of Swansea in 1891.

In March 1888, Llewelyn contested the Gower by-election as a Conservative candidate. The Liberal ranks had been affected by divisions over the choice of candidate and Llewelyn ran a strong campaign. Unusually for a Conservative candidate he held meetings in nonconformist chapels, including one at Zoar, Ystalyfera which was said to have been well attended by the working men of the district. Llewelyn polled well although narrowly defeated by David Randell.

In 1889 he was elected as one of the first members of Glamorgan County Council and was immediately made an alderman, to which role he was re-elected in 1895. He was created a baronet, 'of Penllergaer in Llangyfelach and of Ynys-y-gerwn in Cadoxton juxta Neath both in the County of Glamorgan', on 20 March 1890.

In 1892, following the death of his uncle, Lewis Llewelyn Dillwyn, Llewelyn was adopted as Conservative candidate for the Swansea Town constituency but was defeated by R.D. Burnie. However he reversed the result three years later when he was elected Conservative MP for Swansea in the 1895 general election, but lost the seat in 1900.

Llewelyn's connections to sport included the position of captain of the South Wales Cricket Club and in 1885 he replaced the Earl of Jersey as the president of the Welsh Rugby Union; a post he would hold until 1906, when he was replaced by Horace Lyne. Lyne himself stated that 'they (WRU) had been singularly fortunate in getting a gentleman like Mr J.T.D. Llewelyn to act in that captaincy'.

Family

Llewelyn married in 1861 Caroline Julia, daughter of Sir Michael Hicks Beach, 8th Baronet. Their younger and only surviving son Charles married the heiress of the Venables family and adopted the additional surname Venables. He became MP for Radnorshire and High Sheriff of that county. His eldest son, the cricketer Willie Llewelyn, committed suicide in August 1893.

Later life and death
Llewelyn died in 1927 aged 91 and was buried with his wife and next to his father in St David's Church in Penllergaer.

Legacy
Dillwyn Llewelyn Community School in Cockett, Swansea, was named for him – this was amalgamated with Dynevor School in 2001 to become Dylan Thomas Community School

See also
Spy Cartoon Vanity Fair

Bibliography

References

External links 
 

1836 births
1927 deaths
People educated at Eton College
Alumni of Christ Church, Oxford
UK MPs 1895–1900
Conservative Party (UK) MPs for Welsh constituencies
Politicians from Swansea
Baronets in the Baronetage of the United Kingdom
Wales Rugby Union officials
High Sheriffs of Glamorgan
Members of the Parliament of the United Kingdom for Swansea constituencies
Directors of the Great Western Railway
Members of Glamorgan County Council
Mayors of Swansea
Dillwyn family